The 1893 Baker Methodists football team represented the Baker University in the 1893 college football season. They were dubbed the Champion football team of the Great West.

Schedule

References

Baker
Baker Wildcats football seasons
College football undefeated seasons
Baker Methodists football